Thirunelveli Subramaniyan Balaiah (23 August 1914 – 22 July 1972) was an Indian actor. He is best known for playing supporting roles in Tamil films. Born in Sundankottai, near Udankudi in Thoothukudi, Balaiah was introduced to the cine field by director Ellis R. Dungan in Sathi Leelavathi (1936), along with M. G. Ramachandran, N. S. Krishnan and M. K. Radha. He was one of the very few actors who excelled as a villain, as well as in character roles and comic roles.

Early life & death 
T. S. Balaiah was born on 23 August 1914. He was born in Sundankottai, now in Thoothukudi district, Tamil Nadu Balaiah lived in T. Nagar, and died at the age of 57.

Career 
Being Part of various drama troupe, his career into films started from 'Madurai Original Boys' drama company which had several talented youngsters who created history in Tamil cinema, including M.K. Radha, M. G. Ramachandran, N. S. Krishnan. Balaiah began his film career through the Tamil film Sathi Leelavathi in 1936. Balaiah played first lead role in Mohini paired opposite Madhuri Devi, where he played elder brother to V. N. Janaki and supporting role by M.G.R . He gained lot of weight at the age of 40 in 1954, hence started getting more character roles.  Among his villain roles, Ambikapathy 1937, Andhaman Kaithi, Madurai Veeran, Thaikkupin Tharam, Hello Mister Zamindar and Thiruvilaiyadal were critically acclaimed. Balaiah also excelled in comedy roles in movies such as Kavalai Illaadha Manithan, Kadhalikka Neramillai, Bama Vijayam and Thillana Mohanambal. Actor Sivaji Ganesan had once mentioned that Balaiah along with M. R. Radha was his most admired actor.

Personal life 
Actress Manochithra is his daughter, while one of his sons Junior Balaiah has also appeared in films. Another son, Sai Baba, was part of MSV's troupe and sang a few songs.

Partial filmography

References

External links 
 

1914 births
1972 deaths
20th-century comedians
20th-century Indian male actors
People from Thoothukudi district
Tamil comedians
Tamil male actors
Tamil Nadu State Film Awards winners